Perungattur is a village located in Tiruvannamalai district, Tamil Nadu, South India. It is suburb of Cheyyar town. Its 24 km away from the temple town Kanchipuram.

Population

The population of this village is about 5000 where in it has 2500 votes as per election commission of India; 1200 male votes and 1300 female votes.

Festivals

The people of this village celebrate a number of festivals throughout the year. The main celebrations are ADI THIRUVIZA (mari amman and ponni amman).Venugopalaswamy(Sorgavasal thirapu,Uriadi)and Muthu mari Amman Kovil THIRUVIZHA in Pongal (every 17 January).

Entertainment and sports

The MCC - Magandril Cricket Club was formed in early 1992. Each year in the month of May a cricket tournament is conducted across the division and surrounding villages participate.

Ponds - There are two large ponds In village. They go dry by the mid summer.

The Dr. Ambedkar Kabaddi Kuzhu formed in 30 years ago. Each year in the month of January a Kabaddi tournament in conducted across the division and surrounding villages and towns participate.

Facilities

In the village is a 25 bed Government Hospital which serves surrounding villages for delivery normal/cesarean and all other diseases.

In and around the villages there are many professional and arts colleges. There is a government secondary school in the village. In 2003, there was a theater school in the village.

Indian Bank is located and it serves in and around different villages. Post office is located in main road.

Transportation
There are train stations at nearby Arakonam and Vellore katpadi.

The village is well connected by public transport. Buses are available from Chennai, Arcot, Kanchipuram, Vellore, Cheyyar, Vandavasi, Polur, and Tindivanam.

References

Villages in Tiruvannamalai district
Cities and towns in Tiruvannamalai district